A balloon satellite, sometimes referred to as a "satelloon", is inflated with gas after it has been put into orbit.

Echo 1 and Echo 2 balloon satellites

It served for testing as a "passive" communication and geodetic satellite.

By the time Echo 1 burned up in 1968, the measurements of its orbit by several dozen earth stations had improved our knowledge of the precise shape of the planet by nearly a factor of ten.

Its successor was the similarly built Echo 2 (1964 to about 1970). This satellite circled the Earth about  lower, not at an angle of 47° like that of Echo 1, but in a polar orbit with an average angle of 81°. This enabled radio contact and measurements to be made at higher latitudes. Taking part in the Echo orbit checks to analyze disturbances in its orbit and in the Earth's gravitational field were thirty to fifty professional earth stations, as well as around two hundred amateur astronomers across the planet in "Moonwatch" stations; these contributed around half of all sightings.

Range of radio waves, visibility

The Pythagorean theorem allows us to calculate easily how far a satellite is visible at such a great height. However, the atmosphere causes this figure to vary slightly.

Optical visibility is, however, lower than that of radio waves, because
 the satellite must be illuminated by the sun
 the observer needs a dark sky (that is, he must be in the Earth's own shadow on the planet's twilight or night side)
 the brightness of a sphere depends on the angle between the incident light and the observer (see phases of the moon)
 the brightness of a sphere is much reduced as it approaches the horizon, as atmospheric extinction swallows up as much as 90% of the light

For visual and photographic observation of bright satellites and balloons, and regarding their geodetic use, see Echo 1 and Pageos for further information.

Other balloon satellites

For special testing purposes two or three satellites of the Explorer series were constructed as balloons (possibly Explorer 19 and 38).

Echo 1 was an acknowledged success of radio engineering, but the passive principle of telecommunications (reflection of radio waves on the balloon's surface) was soon replaced by active systems. Telstar 1 (1962) and Early Bird (1965) were able to transmit several hundred audio channels simultaneously in addition to a television program exchanged between continents.

Satellite geodesy with Echo 1 and 2 was able to fulfill all expectations not only for the planned 2–3 years, but for nearly 10 years. For this reason NASA soon planned the launch of the even larger  balloon Pageos. The name is from "passive geodesic satellite", and sounds similar to "Geos", a successful active electronic satellite from 1965.

Pageos and the global network

Pageos was specially launched for the "global network of satellite geodesy", which occupied about 20 full-time observing teams all over the world until 1973. All together they recorded 3000 usable photographic plates from 46 tracking stations with calibrated all-electronic BC-4 cameras (1:3 / focal length ). The coordinator of this project was Professor Hellmut Schmid, from the ETH Zurich.

Three stations of the global network were situated in Europe: Catania in Sicily, Hohenpeißenberg in Bavaria and Tromsø in northern Norway.

The global network enabled the calculation of a "geodetic date" (the geocentric position of the measurement system) on different continents, within a few meters. By the early 1970s reliable values for nearly 100 coefficients of the Earth's gravity field could be calculated.

1965-1975: Success with flashing light beacons

Bright balloon satellites are well visible and were measurable on fine-grained (less sensitive) photographic plates, even at the beginning of space travel, but there were problems with the exact chronometry of a satellite's track. In those days it could only be determined within a few milliseconds.

In order to meet a new goal of measuring the tracking stations precisely within a couple of years, a method of flashing light beacons was adopted around 1960.

To build a three-dimensional measuring network, geodesy needs exactly defined target points, more so than a precise time. This precision is easily reached by having two tracking stations record the same series of flashes from one satellite.

Flash technology was already mature in 1965 when the small electronic satellite Geos (later named Geos 1) was launched; along with its companion Geos 2, it brought about a remarkable increase in precision.

From about 1975 on, almost all optical measurement methods lost their importance, as they were overtaken by speedy progress in electronic distance measurement. Only newly developed methods of observation using CCD and the highly precise star positions of the astrometry satellite Hipparcos made further improvement possible in the measurement of distance.

List of balloon satellites

abbreviations:

 ado = atmospheric density observations
 pcr = passive communications reflector, satellite reflects microwave signals.
 spc = solar pressure calculations, estimate impact of solar wind on orbit.
 tri = satellite triangulation, measuring the Earth's surface.

See also
 Balloon-borne telescope
 Project Beacon
 Telecommunications
 Ionosphere
 Satellite geodesy
 List of passive satellites

Sources
 NSSDC Master Catalog
 Heavens-Above
 Jonathan's Space Report (HUGE: 5MB!)
 Astronautix, Mir EO-9